The JK Tyre National Racing Championship also known as JK-NRC is an auto racing championship series consisting of several one-make series events of open wheel single seater formula cars and saloon cars in India. This championship series is also considered to be the stepping stone for Indian Racing drivers who want to break into international motorsports. Several drivers have gone on to take part in international events including Formula One and A1 Grand Prix and other premier racing series around the world.

Classes
 Formula LGB Swift
 Formula Rolon
 Suzuki Gixxer Cup
 Super Saloon
 Jr. Touring Car

Teams
 Performance racing India
 Bigfoot Racing Coimbatore
 FRK Racing
 Prime Racing
 Rad Racing
 Team Game over
 Chettinad Motorsport
 Tiger Sport
 Dark Don Racing
 Avalanche Motorsports
 Ahura Racing (Women only)
 Momentum Motorsports

National Level Drivers
 Armaan Ebrahim
 Saran Vikram Tmars
 Siddharth Kishore
 Sailesh Bolisetti

 Ashwin Sunder
 Karun Chandhok
 Aditya Patel
 Gaurav Gill
 Lee Keshav
 Rayomand Banajee
 Fazal Khan
 Mohit Aryan
 Kartik Shankar
 Prayanshu Taliyan
 Ganpat Amarnath

 Sudharshan Rao
 Sudanand Rajan
 Prithveen Rajan
 Omkar Paradkar
 Ajay Kini
 Ameya Walavalkar
 Saahil Shelar
 Gaurav Dalal
 Munjal Salva
 Gurniaaz Mann
 Sandeep Kumar
 Gautam Maini
 Parth Ghorpade
 Akhil Devrag
 Anand Prasad
 Oshan Kothadiya
 Mihir Dharker
 Audumber Hede
 Rahil Noorani
 Alisha Abdullah
 Balavijay
 Jagat Nanjappa
 Vidyuth Iyer
 Ram Narayan
 Arjun Balu
 Sanjay Balu
 Vijay Kumar D
 Saurav Bandopadhyay
 Varun Nathwani
 Aditya Akkineni
 Amer Beg
 Gokul Krishna
 Saran Vikram
 Faahad Kutty
 Deepak Chinnapa
 Sarosh Hataria
 Nayan Chatterjee
 Vishnu Prasad
 Jagat Nanjappa
 Steve Hodges
 Diljith T S

 Chittesh Mandody
 Saif Mir

 Shankar Narayan
 Prashanth Krishnamoorthy
 Akhil Kushlani
 J D Madan
 Parthiva Sureshwaran

 Ajith Kumar
Anindith Reddy

 Angad 
 Rajvirdhan
 Gurunath Meiyappan
 Niranjan
 Amittrajit Ghosh
Ishaan Dodhiwala

 Yash Aradhya
 Akhil Rabindra
Akash Gowda

Mira Erda

Related 
 JK Racing Asia Series
 Formula Maruti
 Formula LGB Swift
 Formula LGB Hyundai
 Formula Rolon

References

External links
 http://www.fmsci.in/main/default.html
 http://www.madrasmotorsports.in/
 https://web.archive.org/web/20100110102817/http://www.jktyre.com/motorsports/professional-racing.html
 http://www.team-bhp.com/forum/motor-sports/
 http://www.motorsportindia.com/main2011/
 http://www.motorsportindia.com/main2011/index.php/national-championship/jk-tyre-fmsci-nrc/jktnrc--results.html
 The Federation of Motor Sports Clubs of India

Auto racing series in India
Formula racing series
Recurring sporting events established in 1997